Joseph Sweeney may refer to:

Joseph Sweeney (American politician) (born 1993), New Hampshire State Representative
Joseph Sweeney (actor) (1884–1963), US actor
Joseph Sweeney (Irish politician) (1897–1980), Irish Sinn Féin politician from Donegal
Joseph Modeste Sweeney (1920–2000), dean of the Tulane University Law School
Joseph Sweeney (athlete) (born 1985), distance runner at the 2011 European Cross Country Championships
Joe Sweeney (wrestler) (1933–2016), Australian Olympic wrestler

See also
Joel Sweeney (1810–1860), commonly known as Joe Sweeney, musician